Robot Unicorn Attack is an endless running video game released by Spritonin Media Games on February 4, 2010. In the first week after its release, the game garnered one million plays.  Following Robot Unicorn Attack, Adult Swim released three follow-ups, titled Heavy Metal, Christmas Edition, and Evolution. As part of the Robot Unicorn Attack series, a sequel was developed and released by PikPok for iOS and Android on April 25, 2013, and July 12, 2013, respectively. Robot Unicorn Attack Forever for iOS, a third game rendered in full 3D, was released on April 27, 2017.

Gameplay 

Robot Unicorn Attack is a side scrolling platform game in which the user controls the movement of a robotic unicorn. The object of the game is to prolong gameplay without falling off the stage, crashing into the edges of platforms, or colliding with crystal stars (without first dashing). Points are earned during playtime, by collecting pixies, and by destroying crystal stars by dashing through them. As the game progresses, the stage slides faster. Jumps and dashes can be chained together while the unicorn is airborne. The player has three lives (referred to as "wishes"), and the sum of the scores from each life counts for the player's final score.

Other versions

Heavy Metal 
In October 2010, Adult Swim Games released Robot Unicorn Attack: Heavy Metal, an alternate version of the game featuring different visuals and music, for iPhone. It was later published to Adultswim.com, as well, on November 19, 2010. The game features the song "Battlefield" from German power metal band Blind Guardian. 

The game's presentation is influenced by depictions of Hell as well as glam metal. It received a better score on their website than the original. 

In January 2011, Robot Unicorn Attack: Heavy Metal was made available on Facebook alongside its original counterpart as a single application.

Christmas Edition 
On November 23, 2010, Adult Swim released a Christmas-themed version of Robot Unicorn Attack entitled Robot Unicorn Attack: Christmas Edition. The game features "Christmas Time (Don't Let the Bells End)" by The Darkness. Robot Unicorn Attack: Christmas Edition was released on Adultswim.com in November 2011.

Evolution 
Robot Unicorn Attack: Evolution plays identically to the original, but after three stars are broken in a row (four in a row in the Facebook version), the Robot Unicorn evolves into other robotic creatures. There are also multiple fairies per platform. In the Facebook version, the player must keep breaking stars in order to transform into the next animal; missing a star will cause the animal to revert to the unicorn.

Retro Unicorn Attack 
Retro Unicorn Attack, a version of the game styled after popular video games in the 8-bit era, was released in 2013.

Sequel 
A sequel titled Robot Unicorn Attack 2 was developed by PikPok and released on iOS on April 25, 2013, and Android on July 12, 2013. This sequel expands upon the original's template by adding new maneuvers like the "Rainbow Savior" and "Gallows Gallop". It also introduces enemies, missions, the option to customize your unicorn's appearance, and the ability to fly by equipping wings. The core gameplay and controls remain the same as in the original browser game, but the game also adds a number of new features. The player can collect teardrops that can be used to customize their character. Missions can be completed to unlock new content and abilities. The game also adds enemies, including giant golems. Egyptian and medieval-themed unicorns were introduced in an update, as well as the new threat of solar geysers.
The visuals also received a makeover. The unicorn itself is much more detailed and fluid, and the painted backgrounds also have much more depth and detail. Introduced in a post-launch update was a "celestial unicorn", as well as a new "Lava" course available for purchase with real-world currency.

This is the first Robot Unicorn Attack to include in-game purchases; the player can buy credits to upgrade his or her unicorn and additional sound-packs. Erasure's seminal song "Always" – which was a main part of the original game – is not part of the default package and must be purchased separately for $0.99. 

"I will never be able to separate Always from Robot Unicorn Attack", wrote Kieron Gillen in 2010. "I can't even imagine wanting to do such a thing. It'd be like decapitating the Mona Lisa. It merges with the sparkles of sound effects and the explosions of light and makes it complete." The song is not included with the base game due to copyright, and as Adult Swim wanted the game to be free-to-play, it was made into an in-game purchase. 

Other songs by such bands as Blind Guardian, Slade, Limahl, and Corey Hart are also available for purchase.

Critical reception 

Ivan Williams of 1UP.com stated that, "Whether it's the song constantly on a loop or the simple desire to get a better score than the millions of other gamers playing, I challenge anyone to play Robot Unicorn Attack and not have that game pop into your head every now and then." 

In reviews of the major flash games of 2010, Eurogamer writer Kieron Gillen said, "Like a comet made of gold, glitter and Lady Gaga's eyelashes, Robot Unicorn Attack circled the Earth and filled the firmament with its irresistible radiance for the whole of 2010. It changed lives. It challenged sexualities. It involves pressing two buttons. It is undoubtedly the greatest game of all time that features a Robot Unicorn unless you're a metalhead who digs its sequel."

Scott Sharkey of UGO Networks said that while "the aesthetic is a good gag for a few minutes", the important point of Robot Unicorn Attack is that "the game itself is addictive enough to last much, much longer. At least, until someone catches you playing and ribs you about it for the next week or so." 

Neon Kelly, Previews Editor of VideoGamer.com, concluded after playing that "Somehow the whole thing ends up being extremely addictive - despite the fact that the game's tongue is so firmly wedged in its cheek that it's in danger of giving itself permanent facial damage. If you've not yet done so, I heartily urge you to go try it." 

Toby Green of The Independent wrote in a short review that the game was "Great fun", giving it four out of five stars.

In a review of the iPhone version of the game, CNN writer Topher Kohan concluded, "Easy-to-use controls, great soundtrack, the ability to turn the sound off and get useful feedback via vibrate and fun in-game tidbits. This feels like a game you'll put on your phone, then pull out to play again and again." 

In a twin review for the Australian Broadcasting Corporation by reviewers Stephanie Bendixsen ("Hex") and Steven O'Donnell ("Bajo"), Hex finished by saying, "This game is utterly riDONKulous, so I'm giving it the utterly ridonkulous score of 8971. I can't wait to press Z to chase my dreams again", to which reviewer Bajo responded, "I'm not sure how to score it after that."

See also
Nyan Cat, an Internet meme similar to the game

References

External links 
 Robot Unicorn Attack on the Internet Archive

Adult Swim games
Adult Swim franchises
Browser games
Free online games
2010 video games
IOS games
Android (operating system) games
Fantasy video games
Parody video games
Works about unicorns
Platform games
Side-scrolling video games
Single-player online games
Flash games
Fictional robots
Casual games
Video games about robots
Video games developed in the United States